Sand Spring is an unincorporated community in Garrett County, Maryland, United States.

History
A variant name was "Fearer". A post office called Fearer was established in 1893, and remained in operation until 1939.  The origin of the name "Fearer" is obscure.

References

Unincorporated communities in Garrett County, Maryland
Unincorporated communities in Maryland